The General's Daughter is a 2019 Philippine action drama television series starring Angel Locsin. The series aired on ABS-CBN's Primetime Bida evening block and worldwide via The Filipino Channel from January 21 to October 4, 2019, replacing Ngayon at Kailanman, and was replaced by Starla.

Plot
2nd LT Rhian Bonifacio is an AFP Military Nurse dedicated to save lives. Beneath her benevolent exterior, however, lies a secret - she's a spy, trained by her very own father, "Heneral" Santiago Guerrero, to exact revenge against his sworn enemy, BGen. Marcial de Leon, the commander of the Northern Command of the AFP.

Unbeknownst to Rhian, she has been living a lie - that the father she has known and loved all her life was the enemy all along and has trained her to be used as a weapon against her real father. Having been indoctrinated to believe in the nobility of Tiago's cause, Rhian will be caught in the crossfire between Tiago's cell and the AFP. Rhian will find herself struggling between her love for her false family and the dictates of her conscience.

Cast and characters

Protagonist 
 Angel Locsin as 1st Lt. Rhian Bonifacio, PA  / Arabella de Leon

Main 
 Tirso Cruz III as Lieutenant General Santiago "Heneral Tiago" Guerrero Sr., AFP
 Albert Martinez as Brigadier General Marcial de Leon, AFP
 Janice de Belen as Amelia Montemayor-Guerrero
 Eula Valdes as Corazon de Leon
 Paulo Avelino as Franco "Dos" Segismundo
 Arjo Atayde as Elijah "Elai" Sarmiento
 JC de Vera as Maj. Ethan del Fierro, PA 
 Ryza Cenon as 2nd Lt. Jessica "Jessie" de Leon-del Fierro, PA 
 Maricel Soriano as Isabel "Nanang Sabel" Sarmiento

Supporting
 Loisa Andalio as Claire del Fierro
 Ronnie Alonte as Ivan Cañega
 Art Acuña as Armando Segismundo
 Archie Adamos as BGen. Lorenzo Buencamino, AFP
 Cholo Barretto as 1st Lt. Joselito "Jopet" Ramirez, PA 
 Kim Molina as 2nd Lt. Maria Lilybeth "Billet" Abarquez, PA 
 Tess Antonio as Cora Apostol
 May Bayot as Fedelina Catacutan
 Amy Nobleza as Lea "Ekang" Apostol
 Anne Feo as Helen del Fierro
 Marc Santiago as Santino "Santi" M. Guerrero
 Avery Balasbas as Aradella "Ara" De Leon 
 Nico Antonio as Andrew "Andoy" Apostol
 Kate Alejandrino as Lt. Adelina Manlangit, PA 
 Rafael "Paeng" Sudayan as Papi
 Jim Bergado as Barog
 Lilygem Yulores as Joselyn
 John Steven de Guzman as Tom-Tom
 Luz Valdez as Gloria
 Patrick Quiroz as Amir

Guests
 Ashley Sarmiento as young Rhian
 Francine Diaz as teen Rhian
 Bernard Palanca as young Tiago
 Joseph Bitangcol as young Marcial
 Meg Imperial as young Corazon
 Roxanne Guinoo as young Amelia
 Rino Marco as young Armando
 Brandon Axl as young Franco
 Louise Abuel as teen Franco
 Ruben Maria Soriquez as David Pascal
 Menggie Cobarrubias as Mayor Manuel Sta. Maria
 Leo Rialp as Oscar Villavicencio
 Rolly Inocencio as Mang Eugene
 Jomari Angeles as Caloy
 Dido de la Paz as George Catacutan
 Kiko Matos as Salvador "Buddy" Banzon
 Giovanni Baldisseri as Roman
 Dionne Monsanto as Vera "Ms. Poison" Sangre
 Jong Cuenco as Bernardo "Mr. Mogul" Tuazon
 Nonie Buencamino as BGen. Gregorio "Greg" Maximillano
 Jerome Ponce as young Greg
 Janice Hung as Capt. Alexandra "Cuatro" Noblejas, PA 
 Tart Carlos as Bekbek
 Apollo Abraham as Tiago's Lawyer
 Ces dela Cruz-Guevara as Elvira Ricaforte
 Wilmar Peñaflorida as Tiago's Henchman
 Claire Ruiz as Tintin
 Chai Fonacier as Irene
 Patrick Sugui as Banjo
 Lou Veloso as Amor
 Darwin "Hap Rice" Tolentino as Tomas
 Mark "Big Mac" Andaya as Jack
 Mercedes Cabral as Senator Gabriela "Cinco" Sta. Ana
 Victor Silayan as Zandro "Tres" Abellanosa / Wilson Montino
 Javi Benitez as Vladimir Lejano
 Emilio Garcia as Mayor Dante Velario
 Rochelle Barrameda as Irma Velario
 Lara Morena as Adelfa Dimaranan

Broadcast
The General's Daughter premiered on January 21, 2019, which was simulcast worldwide on iWant TFC and YouTube. The show aired on ABS-CBN's Primetime Bida evening block and worldwide via TFC.

Before the conclusion of the show, it was picked up by the Myanmar-based Sky Net which airs the same over Myanmar.

Reruns
Reruns of The General's Daughter is broadcast through the Kapamilya Channel from June 15, 2020, to January 15, 2021, filling in for  Ang sa Iyo ay Akin'''s originally planned timeslot. It was eventually replaced by the rerun of Asintado on the said timeslot.

Production
Casting
The initial cast of the series, which included Angel Locsin, Maricel Soriano, Janice de Belen, Eula Valdez and Ryza Cenon who had just transferred from the GMA Network, was announced by Dreamscape Entertainment Head Deo Endrinal via Instagram on April 12, 2018. The series would be officially unveiled in November 2018 during ABS-CBN's Family is Love trade event.

The series was first developed around 2014 or 2015, and underwent numerous changes before making it to air in 2019. The biggest change made being that the Rhian Bonifacio character was supposed to be a member of the Navy Seals, which was different from the member of the Army Nurse Corps that the character ended up becoming.

Angel Locsin was the first and sole choice for the role of Rhian Bonifacio. According to Dreamscape's creative head, Rondel Lindayag, only Locsin had the angst to portray the character perfectly. However, Locsin could not accept the role early in its development because she was tied to star in a Darna which was supposed to have been directed by Erik Matti. Locsin would eventually be forced out of the role after suffering a disc bulge on her back. Thereafter, Locsin did not star in another TV series to rehabilitate her back as well as having gone through a break-up with former boyfriend Luis Manzano; the lone exception thereto being a supporting role in La Luna Sangre, which was a sequel to  the Locsin-starrers Lobo and Imortal.

The role of Marcial de Leon was originally offered to Cesar Montano, who declined the role as he was, at the time, the COO of the Tourism Promotion Board, an attached agency of the Department of Tourism. Richard Gomez was next approached to play the role, but he likewise turned down the offer in order to prepare for his bid for reelection as Mayor of Ormoc. The role would eventually be bagged by Albert Martinez who was then a part of Kadenang Ginto, he'd later appear concurrently on both shows.

The series was billed as the "biggest teleserye of 2019" in terms of the cast, the mounting of the drama, the mounting of the action, and the mounting of the interaction between components of the story.

Reception
During its near 9-month run, The General's Daughter was a consistent top rater, second only to perrenial ratings hit FPJ's Ang Probinsyano. Its pilot rating of 34.0% was considered impressive considering that the episode aired on simulcast with its online platforms. The series would then register a higher number, 35.1%, on its second episode. The series would hit its peak on May 16, 2019, as it scored a rating of 36.7%. The show would make history on its September 6, 2019, episode as it placed number 1 on Kantar Media, displacing FPJ's Ang Probinsyano to number 2 for the first time since its debut in 2015; on that broadcast, The General's Daughter scored 32.8% to FPJ's Ang Probinsyano's'' 32.4%. The series would conclude on a high note, registering a rating 35.9%.

Accolades

Notes

See also
List of programs broadcast by ABS-CBN
List of ABS-CBN drama series

Awards

References

External links
 
 

ABS-CBN drama series
Philippine action television series
Philippine military television series
2019 Philippine television series debuts
2019 Philippine television series endings
Television series by Dreamscape Entertainment Television
Filipino-language television shows
Television shows set in the Philippines